Ismail Salah Ismail Loub (in Arabic إسماعيل صلاح إسماعيل لوب), better known by his stage name Lobo Ismail (in Arabic لوبو إسماعيل) or just Lobo (Arabic لوبو) (born in Zarqa, Jordan on 11 August 1974), is a Jordanian singer who lives in Slovakia.

Biography
Lobo is one of 10 siblings in a Jordanian family from Zarqa of Circassian origin. He had inclination to music, dance and languages from early on. Ismail moved to Slovakia in early 2000s where he started his music career. Ismail lives in Košice, Slovakia.

Lobo's 2008 "One More Night (Salam Aleikom)" appears in Future Dance Hits (2008)

Discography

Albums
Ty Si Moja Láska
Lobo

Singles / Videos
"Bain el Asr wal Maghreb"
"Everybody"
"Aïcha"
"One More Night (Salam Aleikom)"
"Salam Aleikom" (feat Emily)
"Ty Si Moja Láska"
"Len S Tebou Sa Dá" (a duo collaboration with Peter Kotuľa)
"Suzanna"
"Meniny"
"Let's Dance (Musicaaa)"

References

External links
Lobo Ismail Official website
Facebook
YouTube page

Jordanian people of Circassian descent
Jordanian male singers
1974 births
Living people
People from Zarqa
Slovak music